Perinatal gangrene of the buttock is a skin condition similar to livedoid dermatitis, and is usually a complication of umbilical artery catheterization, exchange transfusion, or cord injections by means of a syringe.

See also 
 List of cutaneous conditions

References 

Vascular-related cutaneous conditions
Buttocks